Eupithecia fessa is a moth in the family Geometridae. It is found in India (Darjeeling) and Nepal.

References

Moths described in 2010
fessa
Moths of Asia